Sumitro Mujumder (born 18 June 1973) is an Indian former cricketer. He played five first-class matches for Bengal between 1996 and 1998.

See also
 List of Bengal cricketers

References

External links
 

1973 births
Living people
Indian cricketers
Bengal cricketers
Cricketers from Kolkata